Giles Daubeney may refer to:

Giles Daubeney, 3rd Baron Daubeney (died 1386), Baron Daubeney
Giles Daubeney, 4th Baron Daubeney (1371?–1403), MP for Bedfordshire (UK Parliament constituency)
Giles Daubeney, 6th Baron Daubeney (1393–1446)
Giles Daubeney, 1st Baron Daubeney (1451–1508)